This is a list of the flags of Burundi. for the national flag, see Flag of Burundi.

National flag

Ethnic group flags

Political party flags

Historical flags

See also 

 Flag of Burundi
 Coat of arms of Burundi

References 

Lists and galleries of flags
Flags
Flags